Bernd Meier (11 February 1972 – 2 August 2012) was a German professional footballer who played as a goalkeeper.

Playing career
Born in Rain, Swabia, Meier arrived at the professional level at the age of 21, joining TSV 1860 Munich and promoting to the Bundesliga in his first year. During his subsequent four-season spell with the Löwen (lions), he continued to battle for first-choice status with Rainer Berg, appearing in a career-best 33 games in 1995–96 to help his team to the eighth position.

In summer 1999, Meier signed with Borussia Mönchengladbach, playing in only two league matches during his stint, one in each major level of German football. After three years he returned to the second division, going on to start for Rot Weiss Ahlen.

Meier moved to Borussia Dortmund in 2005, at the age of 33, being only third-choice over the course of two seasons, and inclusively being demoted to the reserves. He retired with 94 top level games to his credit.

Coaching career
On 6 January 2010, Meier was named as the new goalkeeper coach of SV Wacker Burghausen.

The following year, in the same capacity, he joined the Germany under-17 team.

Death
Meier died on 2 August 2012 of an apparent heart attack, after being admitted to the hospital for food poisoning. He was only 40 years of age.

References

External links
 

1972 births
2012 deaths
German footballers
Association football goalkeepers
Bundesliga players
2. Bundesliga players
TSV 1860 Munich players
Borussia Mönchengladbach players
Rot Weiss Ahlen players
Borussia Dortmund players
Borussia Dortmund II players
TSV Rain am Lech players